The Pershing Map was the first blueprint for a national highway system in the United States, with many of the proposed roads later forming a substantial portion of the Interstate Highway System.

History
When the United States Army realized it could not satisfactorily meet its World War I logistical needs by railroad alone, it organized truck convoys to supplement them, with the first run in 1917 from Toledo, Ohio, to Baltimore, Maryland. Following the two-month ordeal of the U.S. Army Transcontinental Motor Convoy in 1919, the need for better infrastructure became even clearer.

In 1921, Thomas H. MacDonald, the newly appointed head of the Bureau of Public Roads, requested the Army provide it with a list of roads of "prime importance in the event of war". MacDonald had the Geological Survey and later his own staff painstakingly draft out the details of the Army's request, and presented the sum of these drawings in a massive -long map to Army War Plans. General of the Armies John Pershing himself reported the results back to Congress in 1922, with the proposal becoming known as the "Pershing Map".

The proposal emphasized coastal and Mexican border defense and industrial needs of the time rather than economic development, with high priority routes going to such checkpoints as Sault Ste Marie, Michigan, yet bypassing nearly the entire Deep South. Professor Steven Dutch points out that this routing reflected the technology and needs of the post-World War I military. Coal fields and iron ports were critical for steel production, but the then-nascent oil fields in West Texas and Oklahoma were not yet important, and with little infrastructure, southern Florida was not a priority since any army landing there would have had no method to advance northwards.

References

External links 
History of Illinois roads
The Conquest of Distance (includes Pershing Map)

Interstate Highway System
1922 works
20th-century maps and globes